Federico García Lorca Granada-Jaén Airport , also known as Granada International Airport, is the airport serving the province and city of Granada, in Andalusia, Spain,  although it has Jaén in its name. The airport is located near to Chauchina and Santa Fe, about 9.4 miles (15 km) west of Granada and 62.5 miles (100 km) south of Jaén.

Construction of the airport began in 1970 and it opened as Aeropuerto de Granada in 1972. On June 13, 2006 it was officially named after the poet Federico García Lorca, born near Granada.

Airlines and destinations
The following airlines operate regular scheduled and charter flights at Granada Airport:

Statistics
Passenger numbers and operations since 2000:

References

External links 

  

Airports in Andalusia
Province of Granada
Airports established in 1972